The John Lennon Signature Box is an 11-disc boxed set of remastered John Lennon albums and new collections, released on CD and digital format, as part of the "Gimme Some Truth" collection.  The albums released in the boxed set are digital remasters of the original recordings and mixes, done by John's widow Yoko Ono and the same team of engineers at Abbey Road Studios who worked on the 2009 remasters by The Beatles, in London and Avatar Studios, New York. The set also includes home demos and non-album singles. The boxed set was released on vinyl in June 2015 by Universal Music Catalogue without the two additional discs.

Album listing
Disc 1: John Lennon/Plastic Ono Band (1970)
Disc 2: Imagine (1971)
Discs 3 & 4: Some Time in New York City (1972)
Disc 5: Mind Games (1973)
Disc 6: Walls and Bridges (1974)
Disc 7: Rock ‘n’ Roll (1975)
Disc 8: Double Fantasy (1980)
Disc 9: Milk and Honey (1984)

Additional content
Disc 10 – Non-Album Singles
"Power to the People" – 3:25
"Happy Xmas (War Is Over)" – 3:34
"Instant Karma! (We All Shine On)" – 3:21
"Cold Turkey" – 5:03
"Move Over Ms. L" – 2:58
"Give Peace a Chance" – 4:55

Disc 11 – Home Tapes
"Mother" – 4:25
"Love" – 2:39
"God" – 4:35
"I Found Out" – 4:34
"Nobody Told Me" – 3:13
"Honey Don't" – 1:40
"One of the Boys" – 2:39
"India, India" – 3:07
"Serve Yourself" – 5:21
"Isolation" – 3:07
"Remember" – 5:29
"Beautiful Boy (Darling Boy)" – 4:11
"I Don't Want to Be a Soldier" – 3:26

Charts

See also
 The Beatles (The Original Studio Recordings)
 The Beatles in Mono

References

2010 compilation albums
John Lennon compilation albums
EMI Records compilation albums
Albums produced by John Lennon
Demo albums
Albums recorded at A&M Studios